Request is the second album by South African Gothic rock band The Awakening released during April 1998. Taking a step towards the New Romantic sound, Request brought the band more exposure and club rotation with three singles as well as their first music video for "Rain."

Recording
A calmer, mellower and darker album than its predecessor, Request's singles "Maree", "Rain" and "Before I Leap" saw much success with radio and club rotation.  A music video was shot for "Rain" by director Katinka Harrod. In March 1999, the album was  re-released on Intervention Arts with the bonus track  "The Safety Dance," a cover of the hit by the 1980s synthpop band Men Without Hats.

Track listing
All songs written by Ashton Nyte.

"Request" 
"To Give" 
"Rain" 
"Carnival" 
"Before I Leap" 
"Maree"
"Tamzin" 
"Marked" 
"In the Unholy" 
"Where Roses Grow" 
"Myst" Bonus tracks on United States re-release:
"Before I Leap (dub-coma mix)" 
"The Safety Dance" 
"Request (reprise)"

References

The Awakening (band) albums
1998 albums